The Toshiba T1200 is a discontinued laptop that was manufactured by the Toshiba Corporation, first made in 1987. It is an upgraded version of the Toshiba T1100 Plus.

MS-DOS 3.30 is included with the laptop. It is the first laptop with a swappable battery pack. Its original price was 6499 USD.

The T1200's hard drive has an unusual 26-pin interface made by JVC, incompatible with ST506/412 or ATA interfaces. Floppy drives are connected using similar 26-pin connectors.
The computer has many unique functions, such as Hard RAM - a small part of RAM is battery-backed and can be used as a non-volatile hard drive. Another function allows to suspend the system or power control the hard drive (which is still dependent on the hard disk's on/off switch).

The Toshiba T1200xe is an upgraded model of this laptop, which contained a 12 MHz 80C286 processor and a 20 or 40 MB hard disk drive. It also has 1 MB of RAM expandable to 5 MB. The floppy drive was also upgraded from 720 KB to 1.44 MB.

See also 
 Toshiba T1100
 Toshiba T1000
 Toshiba T3100
 Toshiba T1000LE

References

External links

 Computer Museum article on the Toshiba T1200

IBM PC compatibles
T1200